Phorcus atratus is a species of sea snail, a marine gastropod mollusk in the family Trochidae, the top snails.

Description
The height of the shell varies between 17 mm and 24 mm, its diameter between 16 mm and 19 mm. The solid, imperforate shell has a conical shape. The spire is conical. The apical whorls are eroded, the following dull cinereous or purplish-black, marked with several spiral rows of white spots, or with longitudinal zigzag white stripes. The base of the shell is generally tessellated or striped with white. The shell contains 5 to 6 whorls. The upper ones are marked with spiral impressed lines in young specimens, and two carinae, the latter giving the body whorl a squarish form. The aperture is oblique.  The lip is not much thickened within. The short columella is obsoletely subdentate at its base. Above at the insertion it shows a heavy white callous spread upon the base, invading the umbilicus, and wholly closing it, or leaving only a narrow pit.

This species is quite variable in coloration, the white appearing either in oblique zigzags or in spots. The young are perforate.

Distribution
This marine species occurs in the following locations:
 Cape Verdes
 Canary Islands
 European waters (ERMS scope)
 Senegal

References

 Wood W., 1828: Supplement to the Index Testaceologicus or a catalogue of shells, British and foreign ; London, privately published; pp. VI + 59 + 8 pl
 Nordsieck F., 1974: Il genere Osilinus Philippi, 1847 nei mari europei ; La Conchiglia 9-10 (67-68): 21-23
 Talavera F.G., 1978: Moluscos marinos de las Islas Salvajes. In: Contribución al estudio de la historia natural de las Islas Salvajes; * Aula de Cultura de Tenerife p. 119-128, 1 pl.

External links
 

atratus
Molluscs of the Atlantic Ocean
Molluscs of the Canary Islands
Gastropods of Cape Verde
Invertebrates of West Africa
Gastropods described in 1828